Édouard Martin (born 22 September 1889, date of death unknown) was a French wrestler. He competed in the light heavyweight event at the 1912 Summer Olympics.

References

External links
 

1889 births
Year of death missing
Olympic wrestlers of France
Wrestlers at the 1912 Summer Olympics
French male sport wrestlers
Sportspeople from Paris
20th-century French people